The Australian women's cricket team toured England from May to July 1937. The tour was the second series of the Women's Ashes.

They played 3 Tests against the English women's cricket team, with the series finishing 1-1, with one game drawn.  The Australian women also played 16 tour games.

Test series

1st Test

2nd Test

3rd Test

References

Further reading

External links 
 First Test on English Soil – Talkin' About Women's Cricket description of day one of the First Test

Australia 1937
June 1937 sports events
July 1937 sports events
England 1937
1937 in women's cricket
The Women's Ashes
International cricket competitions from 1918–19 to 1945
1937 in Australian cricket
1937 in English cricket